Marianna Brunianová (1740–1799) was a stage actress.

She was the daughter of the actor Ch. Schulze and married the ballet dancer Mion. From at least 1765 onward, she was engaged at the theater company of JJ Bruniana (whom she married in 1773), where she belonged to the leading members. Prior to the 1780s there was no permanent Czech language theater, but the travelling theater company of JJ Bruniana was based in Prague in 1768-78 and very successful. In 1796-99, she was engaged at the Vlastenské Theatre. She performed in both theater plays and operas and was perticularly noted as a soubrette.

References 

 Starší divadlo v českých zemích do konce 18. století. Osobnosti a díla, ed. A. Jakubcová, Praha: Divadelní ústav – Academia 2007
 http://encyklopedie.idu.cz/index.php/Brunianov%C3%A1,_Marianna

1740 births
1799 deaths
18th-century Bohemian actresses
18th-century actresses